The Night of the 12th is a 2022 thriller film directed by Dominik Moll, from a screenplay he co-wrote with Gilles Marchand, based on the non-fiction book 18.3 – Une année à la PJ by .

The film received ten nominations at the 48th César Awards, winning in six categories, including Best Film, Best Adapted Screenplay, Best Director for Moll, Best Supporting Actor for Lanners, and Most Promising Actor for Bouillon.

Cast
 Bastien Bouillon as Yohan Vivès
 Bouli Lanners as Marceau
 Anouk Grinberg as investigating judge
  as Stéphanie
 Mouna Soualem as Nadia
  as Clara Royer
  as Willy
 Johann Dionnet as Fred
 Thibault Evrard as Loïc
  as Boris
 Paul Jeanson as Jérôme
  as Nathalie Bardot
  as Vincent Caron

Release
The film premiered at the Cannes Film Festival on 20 May 2022. It also screened in the World Cinema section of 27th Busan International Film Festival.

Reception
On the review aggregator Rotten Tomatoes website, the film has an approval rating of 79% based on 14 reviews, with an average rating of 7/10.

Jordan Mintzer of The Hollywood Reporter wrote, "Alongside the two leads, the supporting cast of cops and potential culprits is a mix of unfamiliar yet highly credible faces, grounding the action in a gritty and disquieting reality."

Lissa Nesselson of Screen Daily wrote a positive review of the film, writing, "A deft and satisfying police procedural in command of its unusual tone, The Night of the 12th [...] is perfectly cast and constructed with quietly thrilling rigour."

Awards and nominations

References

External links
 
 
 

2020s French films
2020s French-language films
2022 crime thriller films
2020s mystery thriller films
Belgian crime thriller films
Belgian mystery thriller films
Crime films based on actual events
Films based on non-fiction books
Films set in the Alps
Films shot in Isère
French crime thriller films
French detective films
French films based on actual events
French mystery thriller films
French-language Belgian films
Murder mystery films
Mystery films based on actual events
Thriller films based on actual events
Best Film César Award winners
Best Film Lumières Award winners
Films set in 2016